Zygonemertes is a genus of worms belonging to the family Zygonemertidae.

The species of this genus are found in North America.

Species:

Zygonemertes africana 
Zygonemertes albida 
Zygonemertes algensis 
Zygonemertes capensis 
Zygonemertes cocacola 
Zygonemertes fragariae 
Zygonemertes glandulosa 
Zygonemertes isabellae 
Zygonemertes jamsteci 
Zygonemertes luederitzi 
Zygonemertes maslovskyi 
Zygonemertes shintai 
Zygonemertes simoneae 
Zygonemertes tenuirostris 
Zygonemertes thalassina 
Zygonemertes virescens 
Zygonemertes wadjemupensis 
Zygonemertes zhenylebedevi

References

Nemerteans